Lander's Wagon and Carriage Shop in Humboldt, Kansas was listed on the National Register of Historic Places in 2017.

It is a one-part, two-story commercial building of native limestone blocks with the original portion  in plan. It has a decorative wooden Italianate-style cornice. A  single-story extension was added in 1910.

It has also been known as the Elliot Property.

References

Commercial buildings on the National Register of Historic Places in Kansas
Allen County, Kansas